Sidney Sheldon's After the Darkness is a 2010 novel by Tilly Bagshawe.  Bagshawe began writing Sidney Sheldon works after the latter's death in 2007.  After writing Mistress of the Game, Tilly Bagshawe once again recaptured the late Sidney Sheldon’s way of thriller writing in After the Darkness. The novel echoes the Bernie Madoff scandal in America.

The author contends that she “[wrote] and research[ed] as Sidney did. I pretty much read all his work, dreaming it, and thought it to get it right. I tried very consciously to be true to him and sound like his voice.”

Plot summary
Grace Brookstein lived a luxurious lifestyle despite the economic free fall in the US. Then suddenly her billionaire husband Lenny mysteriously disappears in a tragic sailing accident. Along with Lenny's disappearance, Lenny's hedge fund, the Quorum, which has a $75 billion investment, is also missing and everyone believes that Grace stole the money. Lenny's death was ruled as suicide and Grace was convicted and imprisoned. Grace believed that she was framed. Now alone with no one to turn to, she is determined to find out who is framing her and is desperate for revenge.
The book provides a brilliant description of the transformation of the quiet Grace Brookstein from an innocent young woman who had 'never even looked at the price tags of things' to a determined person who fights the world alone, on her own.
Once Grace is convicted of money laundering, she is betrayed by her family and friends. She has no one to turn to and tries to commit suicide but she survives. This is when Grace starts to undergo a change. With the help of her cellmates, she flees from prison. The rest of the story deals with the way she reaches the culprit, the further betrayals she suffers and how she deals with the abominable situations she encounters in her way of taking revenge. On her way to truth, she realises that till now she had been living in a fantasy and the reality was something totally disparate.

References

2010 American novels
Novels by Sidney Sheldon
William Morrow and Company books